Luke McDonald or MacDonald may refer to:

People
Luke McDonald, musician, lead guitar player in Sunk Loto
Luke McDonald (footballer) (born 1995), drafted to North Melbourne in 2013

Fictional characters
Luke McDonald (True Blood)
Luke MacDonald, fictional character in El Dorado (1966 film)
Luke MacDonald (fictional character), see List of Parker Lewis Can't Lose episodes